Samuel Sidney McClure (February 17, 1857 – March 21, 1949) was an Irish-American publisher who became known as a key figure in investigative, or muckraking, journalism. He co-founded and ran McClure's Magazine from 1893 to 1911, which ran numerous exposées of wrongdoing in business and politics, such as those written by Ida Tarbell, Ray Stannard Baker, and Lincoln Steffens. The magazine ran fiction and nonfiction by the leading writers of the day, including Sarah Orne Jewett, Mark Twain, William Dean Howells, Joel Chandler Harris, Jack London, Stephen Crane, William Allen White and Willa Cather.

Biography
He was born to an Ulster Scots family in County Antrim in what is now Northern Ireland, and emigrated with his widowed mother to Indiana when he was nine years old.  He grew up in near poverty on a farm and graduated from Valparaiso High School in 1875. He worked his way through Knox College, where he co-founded its student newspaper, and later moved to New York City.

In 1884, he established the McClure Syndicate, the first U.S. newspaper syndicate, and published in Sunday newspapers, containing serials of books, recipes and reviews.

He founded McClure's Magazine in 1893 and ran it successfully until 1911 when poor health and financial reorganization forced him out (and many of his writers had defected to form their own magazine). McClure's Magazine published influential pieces by respected journalists and authors including Jack London, Ida Tarbell, Upton Sinclair, Burton J. Hendrick, Rudyard Kipling, Sir Arthur Conan Doyle, Robert Louis Stevenson, Willa Cather, and Lincoln Steffens. Through his magazine, he introduced Dr. Maria Montessori's new teaching methods to North America in 1911.

McClure was a business partner of Frank Nelson Doubleday in Doubleday & McClure, ancestor to today's Doubleday imprint. After McClure left Doubleday, he established the publisher McClure, Phillips and Company with John Sanborn Phillips. Phillips left to purchase The American Magazine in 1906 and McClure sold his book publishing operations to Doubleday, Page in 1908. After he was ousted in 1911, McClure's Magazine serialized his autobiography, ghost-written by one of the magazine's editors, Willa Cather.

McClure created a whole new form of writing for his journalists that we still use today. Instead of demanding that his writers give him articles for his paper immediately, he would give them all the time they needed to do extensive research on their topics.

Rudyard Kipling was one writer who rejected McClure's offer of a long-term contract, quoting as justification Ecclesiasticus (Chapt. 33, verse 21): "As long as thou livest and hast breath in thee, give not thyself over to any". Kipling was also present when McClure began to contemplate the launch of a new literary magazine. He recalled in his autobiography:

He died in New York City in 1949, at the age of 92. He is buried next to his wife Harriet at Hope Cemetery in Galesburg, Illinois.

Legacy
According to his biographer Peter Lyon, McClure was, "one of the greatest instinctive editors ever to function in the US, and one of the most wretched businessmen." Lyon suggests that he had a manic-depressive personality, combining enthusiasm, tenacity, and a remarkable talent for predicting public responses. He favored Western writers, and especially muckraking articles that made his magazine famous. On the other hand, he was unstable with a hair-trigger impatience that alienated many staffers. Always in the red, he sold first his book publishing house, then his nationwide newspaper syndicate, and finally his own magazine.

Notes

Further reading
 Baxter, Katherine Isobel. "'He's lost more money on Joseph Conrad than any editor alive!': Conrad and McClure's Magazine." Conradiana 41.2 (2009): 114–131.
 Gorton, Stephanie. Citizen Reporters: S. S. McClure, Ida Tarbell, and the Magazine that Rewrote America. New York: Ecco/HarperCollins, 2020. 

 (Ghostwritten by Willa Cather), a primary source
McCully, Emily Arnold (2014). Ida M. Tarbell The Woman Who Challenged Big Business and Won. New York: Clarion Books. 

 Urgo, Joseph R. "Willa Cather's Political Apprenticeship at McClure's Magazine." in Willa Cather’s New York: New Essays on Cather in the City (2000): 60–74.

External links

 McClure Publishing Company Archives - Special Collections, University of Delaware Library
 

1857 births
1949 deaths
American male journalists
American people of Scotch-Irish descent
Knox College (Illinois) alumni
McClure's
American magazine founders
Irish emigrants to the United States (before 1923)
Progressive Era in the United States
American investigative journalists